Microsorum is a genus of ferns in the family Polypodiaceae, subfamily Microsoroideae, according to the Pteridophyte Phylogeny Group classification of 2016 (PPG I). The species are tropical.  Like most ferns, they grow from rhizomes, rather than roots. The genus name is often misspelled "Microsorium" or "Microsoreum".  It includes some species that are lithophytic rheophytes.

Taxonomy
The genus Phymatosorus is included in Microsorum in the Pteridophyte Phylogeny Group classification of 2016 (PPG I). , both the Checklist of Ferns and Lycophytes of the World and Plants of the World Online kept Phymatosorus separate. A 2019 molecular phylogenetic study of the subfamily Microsoroideae did not distinguish Phymatosorus from Microsorum, and suggested that the genus as there circumscribed was sister to Leptochilus, together forming one of the three main clades in the subfamily:

Species
, the Checklist of Ferns and Lycophytes of the World recognized the following species, either in Microsorum or in Phymatosorus with a synonym in Microsorum (marked "[P]" in the list).

Microsorum aichmophyllum (Alston) Fraser-Jenk.
Microsorum alatum (Brack.) Copel. [P]
Microsorum aurantiacum Noot.
Microsorum australiense (Bailey) Bostock
Microsorum baithoense V.N.Tu
Microsorum biseriatum (Bosman) Noot. [P]
Microsorum cinctum Bosman
Microsorum commutatum (Blume) Copel. [P]
Microsorum congregatifolium (Alderw.) Holttum
Microsorum cromwellii (Rosenst.) Copel. [P]
Microsorum cuspidatum (D. Don) Tagawa [P]
Microsorum egregium (Brause) Bosman
Microsorum glossophyllum (Copel.) Copel.
Microsorum griseorhizoma Gilli
Microsorum grossum (Langsd. & Fisch.) S. B. Andrews [P]
Microsorum hainanense Noot. [P]
Microsorum heterocarpum (Blume) Ching
Microsorum heterolobum (C.Chr.) Copel.
Microsorum krayanense M.Kato, Darnaedi & K.Iwats.
Microsorum longissimum J.Sm. ex Fée
Microsorum maximum (Brack.) Copel.
Microsorum membranifolium (R. Br.) Ching [P]
Microsorum monstrosum (Copel.) Copel.
Microsorum musifolium (Blume) Copel.
Microsorum papuanum (Baker) Parris [P]
Microsorum parksii (Copel.) Copel. [P]
Microsorum pentaphyllum (Baker) Copel.
Microsorum piliferum V.N.Tu
Microsorum pitcairnense Copel.
Microsorum punctatum (L.) Copel.
Microsorum rampans (Baker) Parris
Microsorum rubidum (Kunze) Copel. [P]
Microsorum samarense (J.Sm.) Bosman
Microsorum sarawakense (Baker) Holttum
Microsorum scolopendria (Burm. fil.) Copel. [P]
Microsorum siamense Boonkerd
Microsorum sibomense (Rosenst.) Copel.
Microsorum sopuense Bosman
Microsorum spectrum (Kaulf.) Copel.
Microsorum steerei (Harr.) Ching
Microsorum submarginale M.Kato, Darnaedi & K.Iwats.
Microsorum thailandicum Boonkerd & Noot.
Microsorum × tohieaense J.H.Nitta
Microsorum whiteheadii A.R.Sm. & Hoshiz.

Species placed elsewhere by the Checklist of Ferns and Lycophytes of the World include:
Microsorum lastii (Baker) Tardieu = Bosmania lastii
Microsorum latilobatum Hennipman & Hett. = Dendroconche latilobata
Microsorum leandrianum Tardieu = Bosmania leandriana
Microsorum linguiforme Copel. = Dendroconche linguiforme
Microsorum membranaceum (D.Don) Ching = Bosmania membranacea
Microsorum pappei (Mett.) Tardieu = Neolepisorus pappei
Microsorum varians (Mett.) Hennipman & Hett. = Dendroconche varians
Microsorum zippelii Ching = Neolepisorus zippelii

References

Bibliography
 D.J. Mabberley. 2008. Mabberley's plant-book: a portable dictionary of plants, their classification and uses, third edition, revised, Cambridge University Press, 1021 pages

Polypodiaceae
Fern genera